Ajay Kumar Singh may refer to:

 A. K. Singh (full name Ajay Kumar Singh), Lieutenant Governor of Andaman and Nicobar Islands
 Ajay Kumar Singh (Bihar politician, Bharatiya Janata Party), former member of the Bihar Legislative Assembly
 Ajay Kumar Singh (police officer) (died 2000), Superintendent of Police of Lohardaga district
 Ajay Kumar Singh (Uttar Pradesh politician), member of the Legislative Assembly of India
 Ajay Kumar Singh (RJD politician), member of the Bihar Legislative Council
 Ajay Kumar Singh (Bihar politician, Indian National Congtress), Bihar Legislative Assembly representative from Jamalpur